Bihar Reorganisation Act, 2000 was a law passed by the parliament of India in 2000. Loksabha and Rajya sabha passed the bill on 2 and 11 August respectively and on 15 November 2000, which enabled creation of Jharkhand State out of Bihar.  The law was introduced by the NDA government headed by Atal Bihari Vajpayee to fulfil an election promise.

Criticism 
It was criticised by Arjun Munda, as he thought it to be biased.

Definitions 

 Article: means an article of the Constitution.
 Election Commission: means the Election Commission appointed by the President under article 324.

Important sections 
 Section 113: It states that here will be Jharkhand comprising the following districts of the existing State of Bihar-
 Bokaro
 Chatra
 Deoghar
 Dhanbad
 Dumka
 Garhwa
 Giridih
 Godda
 Gumla
 Hazaribagh
 Kodarma
 Lohardaga 
 Pakur
 Palamu
 Ranchi (the new capital)
 Sahebganj 
 Singhbhum (East) 
 Singhbhum (West)

References

Acts of the Parliament of India 2000
Vajpayee administration initiatives
Reorganisation of Indian states
History of Bihar (1947–present)
History of Jharkhand (1947–present)